Francisco Sunara (born 11 November 1905, date of death unknown) was a Uruguayan rower. He competed in the men's coxed four at the 1936 Summer Olympics.

References

External links

1905 births
Year of death missing
Uruguayan male rowers
Olympic rowers of Uruguay
Rowers at the 1936 Summer Olympics
Place of birth missing
20th-century Uruguayan people